Mirolyubovo is a village in Burgas Municipality in Burgas Province, in southeastern Bulgaria.

References

Villages in Burgas Province